Somapura Mahavihara or Paharpur Buddhist Vihara in Paharpur, Badalgachhi, Naogaon, Bangladesh is among the best known Buddhist viharas or monasteries in the Indian Subcontinent and is one of the most important archaeological sites in the country. It was designated as a UNESCO World Heritage Site in 1985. It is one of the most famous examples of architecture in pre-Islamic Bangladesh. It dates from a period to the nearby Halud Vihara and to the Sitakot Vihara in Nawabganj Upazila of Dinajpur District.

History 

A number of monasteries grew up during the Pāla period in ancient India in the eastern regions of the Indian subcontinent, comprising Bengal and Magadha. According to Tibetan sources, five great Mahaviharas (universities) stood out: Vikramashila, the premier university of the era; Nalanda, past its prime but still illustrious; Somapura Mahavihara; Odantapurā; and Jaggadala. The mahaviharas formed a network; "all of them were under state supervision" and there existed "a system of co-ordination among them ... it seems from the evidence that the different seats of Buddhist learning that functioned in eastern India under the Pāla were regarded together as forming a network, an interlinked group of institutions," and it was common for great scholars to move easily from position to position among them. Xuanzang of China was a noted scholar who resided at the Somapura Mahavihara (the largest university in ancient India), and Atisa traveled from Bengal to Tibet to preach Buddhism. The earliest form of the Bengali language began to the emerge during the eighth century.

The excavation at Paharpur, and the finding of seals bearing the inscription Shri-Somapure-Shri-Dharmapaladeva-Mahavihariyarya-bhiksu-sangghasya, has identified the Somapura Mahavihara as built by the second Pala king Dharmapala (circa 781–821) of Pāla Dynasty. Tibetan sources, including Tibetan translations of Dharmakayavidhi and Madhyamaka Ratnapradipa, Taranatha's history and Pag-Sam-Jon-Zang, mention that Dharmapala's successor Devapala (circa 810–850) built it after his conquest of Varendra. The Paharpur pillar inscription bears the mention of 5th regnal year of Devapala's successor Mahendrapala (circa 850–854) along with the name of Bhiksu Ajayagarbha. Taranatha's Pag Sam Jon Zang records that the monastery was repaired during the reign of Mahipala (circa 995–1043 AD).

Jatvarma of Varman dynasty attacked Varendra in 11th century with hostility towards Kaivarta king Divya and Buddhism. Though the Kaivarta regime did not seem to suffer any loss, a part of the Mahavihara was destroyed by fire set by Jatvarma's army.

Over time Atisha's spiritual preceptor, Ratnakara Shanti, served as a sthavira of the vihara, Mahapanditacharya Bodhibhadra served as a resident monk, and other scholars spent part of their lives at the monastery, including Kalamahapada, Viryendra and Karunashrimitra. Many Tibetan monks visited the Somapura between the 9th and 12th centuries.

During the rule of the Sena dynasty in the second half of the 12th century the vihara started to decline for the last time. One scholar writes, "The ruins of the temple and monasteries at Pāhāpur do not bear any evident marks of large-scale destruction. The downfall of the establishment, by desertion or destruction, must have been sometime in the midst of the widespread unrest and displacement of population consequent on the Muslim invasion."

A copperplate dated to 159 Gupta Era (479 AD) discovered in 1927 in the northeast corner of the monastery, mentions donation of a Brahmin couple to Jain Acharya Guhanandi of Pancha-stupa Nikaya at Vata Gohli, identifiable as the neighbouring village of Goalapara.

Architecture 

The quadrangular structure consists of 177 cells and a traditional Buddhist stupa in the centre. The rooms were used by the monks for accommodation and meditation. In addition to the large number of stupas and shrines of various sizes and shapes, terracotta plaques, stone sculptures, inscriptions, coins, ceramics etc. have been discovered.

The site houses the architectural remains of a vast Buddhist monastery, Somapura Mahavihara, covering . It was an important intellectual centre for Dharmic Traditions such as Buddhists (Buddha Dharma), Jains (Jaina Dharma) and Hindus (Sanatana Dharma) alike. The  complex has 177 cells, viharas, numerous stupas, temples and a number of other ancillary buildings. The outside walls with ornamental terracotta plaques still display the influence of these three religions.

In acreage, Somapura was the largest of the mahaviharas. According to Sukumar Dutt, the complex was dominated by a temple, which was strongly reminiscent of Hindu-Buddhist temples of Burma, Java and Cambodia, reproducing the cruciform basement, terraced structure with inset chambers and gradually dwindling pyramid form ... during the age of the Palas some sort of intercourse between eastern India and south-east Asia existed." Another commented, "there can be no doubt that this style of architecture has most profoundly influenced that of Burma, Java and Cambodia. The nearest approximation to the plan and the superstructure of the Paharpur temple is afforded by the temples known as Chandi Loro Jongrang and Chandi Sevu of Prambanam in Central Java."

Central temple 

The purpose of this central structure at the midst of the courtyard remains unsolved since its discovery. Hence, most of the debates generated hitherto on the architecture of Sompur Mahavihara are centered on the identification its missing superstructure. The reason may be manifold, but the most important one is the non-availability of substantial amount of first-hand resource including a comprehensive architectural documentation at the disposal of the researchers. There are different arguments regarding the terminating top of the central structure of Sompur Mahavihara.

Consequently, most of the works done so far are mainly based on the findings of the archaeological excavation and studying the artefacts from the archaeological perspective. The first study on this monument with documentation was by archaeologist K. N. Dikhist in his Paharpur, Memoirs of Archaeological Survey in India (1938). Dikhsit was concerned with documentation of the archaeological findings and concentrated on their interpretation and analysis. He attempted to suggest a probable architectural treatment of the missing parts of the structure through studying the archaeological remains. Till today, this study is considered as the most authentic record of the Sompur Mahavihara.

Prudence R. Myer published the first of such studies in 1969 as a journal paper, in which she proposed the missing superstructure as a stupa and illustrated the possible three-dimensional articulations. Myer embarked on her proposal through a diachronic study of the stupa and stupa shrines in India. She took Sompura Mahavihara as an example to elaborate her study and produced a conjectural restoration of the central structure in support of her analysis.

The second work was published around thirty years after Myer's proposition. A team of architects from Khulna University led by Mohammed Ali Naqi has proposed another theoretical reconstruction of the central structure as well as some parts of the peripheral block (mainly the entrance hall) in 1999. This work was also presented in the "International Seminar on Elaboration of an Archaeological Research Strategy for Paharpur World Heritage Site and Its Environment" jointly organised by UNESCO and Department of Archaeology of Bangladesh in 2004. Muhammad Ali Naqi proposed a temple-like spire at the top by considering the central mound as a 'Stupa-Shrine' with a 'Shikhara' type stupa in his reconstruction.

In 2012 Mohammad Habib Reza through a contextual analysis of the early Buddhist architecture of Bengal in his doctoral thesis proposes:the core of Pahāŗpur vihāra was similar to pañcharatna temple crown and with four more crowns over the maņdapas it should have looked like the Ānanda temple of Pagan; however, due to its earlier construction period its appearance was more flat than the Ānanda temple.

Popular media 

Many video documentaries have been made of Paharpur Buddhist Vihara, including 2016 Eid special Teli film Chader shohor Onair By Channel i. directed By Razib Hasan Cast By Satabdi owudut, mithila, tarq shopon, full of stories and cinematography around the Vihara.

Protection 

Somapura was designated a UNESCO World Heritage Site in 1985. Since then, a series of UNESCO missions has regularly visited the site and helped with the project. Moreover, the UN body prepared a master plan, involving US$5.6 million.

The terracotta artworks in the site have suffered from serious damage as a result of "lack of proper maintenance, shortage of manpower, fund constraint and heavy rainfall And the major problem is the corruption of Bangladesh." Furthermore, poor water drainage accompanied by high levels of salinity in the soils has contributed to decay the terracotta sculptures. Other threats include uncontrolled vegetation, vandalism, climate conditions, and public trespassing and encroachment.

Gallery

See also
 List of World Heritage Sites in Bangladesh
 List of Buddhist viharas in Bangladesh
 List of colossal sculpture in situ
 Bikrampur Vihara
 Wari-Bateshwar ruins
 Bhitagarh
 List of archaeological sites in Bangladesh

Notes

References

External links
UNESCO Link https://whc.unesco.org/en/list/322/
 Pharapur Buddhist Vihara from Department of Archeology, Government of Bangladesh
 World Heritage Site
 More info,images, videos, 360degree panoramic views and more 

Ancient universities of the Indian subcontinent
Archaeological sites in Bangladesh
Buddhist monasteries in Bangladesh
Buddhist sites in Bangladesh
Buddhist universities and colleges
Buildings and structures completed in the 9th century
Former populated places in Bangladesh
Naogaon District
Pala Empire
World Heritage Sites in Bangladesh